Óscar Pérez Bovela (born 27 August 1981) is a Spanish former professional footballer who played as a midfielder.

Club career
Pérez was born in Oviedo, Asturias. He started his professional career with hometown club Real Oviedo, but was not very successful there, playing only 14 games with the main squad over three seasons as they consecutively dropped two divisions.

Pérez then continued his career in the Segunda División where, in the 2004–05 campaign, another relegation befell, with Córdoba CF. In late January 2006, with the Andalusians in the Segunda División B, he moved to England with Bolton Wanderers, but did not manage any first-team appearances.

After being released in May 2006 with four other players, Pérez returned to Spain, signing with CD Tenerife. As the Canary Islands side returned to the top flight in 2009 after seven years, he appeared in 29 matches (although only three complete), scoring once.

In July 2009, Pérez was bought by Udinese Calcio in Italy with compatriot Iván Amaya, but both were immediately transferred to Granada CF as seven other players, after the two clubs' partnership agreement. In his first season, he contributed 16 games as the team returned to division two after an absence of more than 20 years.

In late July 2011, Pérez joined Cádiz CF of the third tier in a season-long loan.

References

External links

1981 births
Living people
Spanish footballers
Footballers from Oviedo
Association football midfielders
La Liga players
Segunda División players
Segunda División B players
Tercera División players
Real Oviedo Vetusta players
Real Oviedo players
SD Eibar footballers
Córdoba CF players
CD Tenerife players
Granada CF footballers
Cádiz CF players
Racing de Santander players
Caudal Deportivo footballers
Marino de Luanco footballers
Bolton Wanderers F.C. players
Udinese Calcio players
Oscar Perez
Spanish expatriate footballers
Expatriate footballers in England
Expatriate footballers in Thailand
Spanish expatriate sportspeople in England
Spanish expatriate sportspeople in Thailand